Prat is a commune in the Côtes-d'Armor department of Brittany in northwestern France.

Population
Inhabitants of Prat are called pratais in French.

Breton language
The municipality launched a linguistic plan through Ya d'ar brezhoneg on 27 May 2006.

Sights
The fifteenth century Trévoazan church collapsed in the 1910s and was designated as a historic landmark in 1926. The remains of the frontage and the tower can still be seen. The Manoir de Coatelan, also from the fifteenth century, was classified as a historic monument in 1927.

See also
Communes of the Côtes-d'Armor department

References

External links

Communes of Côtes-d'Armor